The SDP Youth Forum (FM SDP)  is the youth organisation of the Social Democratic Party of Croatia (SDP).

According to Youth Forum statute, it is an organisation that is committed to building a democratic society in which solidarity, freedom, equality, social justice and quality education will be available to everyone. It sees a society in which the dignity of the individual will be guaranteed in social, legal and economic certainty. Its goal is to enable young people to participate in public life and decision-making process. Youth Forum members are able to get involved in the SDP through local policy events, campaigning or by attending events and social gatherings.

Youth Forum was founded in 1992 and is affiliated internationally to both the International Union of Socialist Youth and Young European Socialists.

Membership
Every Croatian citizen from 16 to 30 years of age can become a member of the Youth Forum. Members of Youth Forum do not have to be members of SDP, but must not be members of another political party. The organisation has more than 8,000 members.

Structure
The structure of the organization is determined by organisation's statute. It is organised at the state level and consists of county, city and municipal organizations.

The central authorities are:
 Convention 
 Main Board 
 The Supervisory Board 
 The Presidency 
 President

The highest body of the Youth forum is the Convention that consists of delegates elected on the conventions of local organizations. Delegates elect the President, Vice-Presidents and the Supervisory Board for a term of two years. President of Youth forum is in charge of representing the organization in public.

The student wing of Youth Forum is Social Democratic Students Union (SSU).

Current leadership: 
President - Lovro Lukavečki 
Secretary general -  Marija Jagecic
International secretary - Dajana Ivičić

National congresses 

 1992: 1. congress (founding)  
 1996: 2. congress
 05. 01. 1998.: 3 congress 
 17. 12. 2000.: 4. congress
 21. and 22. 12. 2002.: 5. congress 
 26. 08. 2005.: 6. congress 
 8. 03. 2008.: 7. congress 
 22. 05. 2010.: 8. congress 
 05. 07. 2014.: 9. congress
 18. 03. 2017.: 10. congress

Presidents 
 Igor Dragovan
 NN
 Hrvoje Klasić
 Gordan Maras
 Arsen Bauk
 Dan Špicer
 Davor Bernardić
 Saša Đujić
 Nenad Livun
 Biljana Gaća
 Lovro Lukavečki

References

Organizations based in Zagreb
Youth organizations established in 1990
Socialism in Croatia
Youth in Croatia
Youth wings of social democratic parties
Social Democratic Party of Croatia